Triadenum fraseri, commonly known as bog St. John's wort, Fraser's St. John's wort, and Fraser's marsh St. John's wort, is a perennial flowering plant in the family Hypericaceae that grows in wetlands of Canada and the northern United States. It is named after John Fraser (1750–1811), a Scottish botanist and widely travelled plant collector.

Description

The plant displays clusters of a few to several flowers arising from leaf axils, at the end of branching stems. The flower typically appears closed like a bud. Each flower features 9 to 12 yellow stamens. Triadenum fraseri is typically in flower each year from July through September.

Taxonomy
The genus name Triadenum is derived from the Greek meaning "three glands". This name refers to the plant's three-chambered capsule fruit. The species was named in honor of 18th- and early 19th-century Scottish botanist John Fraser (1750–1811). During his career, Fraser served Russian monarchs and collected plant specimens during voyages through North America, the West Indies, and Russia. Fraser was hailed early on by his biographers as "one of the most enterprising, indefatigable, and persevering men that ever embarked in the cause of botany and natural science".

Triadenum fraseri is closely related to Triadenum virginicum.

Botanists have applied several synonyms in identifying Triadenum fraseri, including:

 Elodea fraseri Spach
 Hypericum fraseri (Spach) Steud.
 Hypericum virginicum var. fraseri (Spach) Fernald
 Triadenum virginicum ssp. fraseri (Spach) J. Gillett
 Triadenum virginicum var. fraseri (Spach) Cooperr.

Distribution and habitat
Triadenum fraseri thrives in wetlands habitats of "bogs, marshes, swales, sedgy meadows, moist sandy (even marly) shores, conifer swamps and alder thickets".

The United States Department of Agriculture describes Triadenum fraseri as a native species within the states of Connecticut, Illinois, Indiana, Iowa, Maine, Massachusetts, Michigan, Minnesota, Nebraska (rare), New Hampshire, New Jersey (rare), New York, North Carolina (rare), Ohio, Pennsylvania, Rhode Island, Tennessee (rare), Vermont, Virginia (rare), Washington, West Virginia, and Wisconsin, in the United States; and in the provinces of British Columbia, Manitoba, New Brunswick, Nova Scotia, Ontario, Quebec, Newfoundland, Prince Edward Island, Saskatchewan (rare), in Canada; and in the French overseas territories of Saint Pierre and Miquelon. It is categorized as an "obligate wetland" plant by the U.S. Army Corps of Engineers for the Atlantic and Gulf Coastal Plain, Eastern Mountains and Piedmont, Great Plains, Midwest, Northcentral and Northeast; and Western Mountains, Valleys, and Coast regions.

References

fraseri
Flora of North America